The American Music Award for Favorite Artist – Rap/Hip Hop has been awarded since 1989. Years reflect the year during which the awards were presented, for works released in the previous year (until 2003 onward, when awards were handed out on November of the same year). Nicki Minaj has received the most wins (5) and Drake has received the most nominations (9).

Winners and nominees

1980s

1990s

2000s

2010s

2020s

Category facts

Multiple wins

 5 wins 
 Nicki Minaj

 4 wins 
 Eminem

 3 wins
 Drake
 MC Hammer

 2 wins
 Dr. Dre
 Jay-Z
 Missy Elliott
 Cardi B

Multiple nominations

 10 nominations
 Drake

 8 nominations
 Eminem

 5 nominations
 Cardi B
 Nicki Minaj

 4 nominations
 Jay-Z
 Kanye West

 3 nominations
 Bone Thugs-n-Harmony
 Lil Wayne
 MC Hammer
 Megan Thee Stallion
 Nelly
 T.I.

 2 nominations
 50 Cent
 Coolio
 DJ Jazzy Jeff & The Fresh Prince
 DMX
 Dr. Dre
 Fetty Wap
 Future
 Ja Rule
 Juvenile
 Kendrick Lamar
 Lil Baby
 Lil' Kim
 Missy Elliott
 Puff Daddy
 Salt-N-Pepa
 Tupac Shakur

References

American Music Awards
Hip hop awards
Awards established in 1989
1989 establishments in the United States